The 1920 Alabama coal strike, or the Alabama miners' strike, was a statewide strike of the United Mine Workers of America against coal mine operators.  The strike was marked by racial violence, and ended in significant defeat for the union and organized labor in Alabama.

Conditions 

UMW president John L. Lewis authorized the calling of a general strike on September 1, and the strike formally began at midnight on September 8. As many as 15,000 of the 27,000 coal miners in the state stopped work. UMW vice-president Van Bittner was sent to the state to oversee the effort.

The main union demands were union recognition, and that the operators put into effect the wage award decided by the Bituminous Coal Commission earlier in the year. One fundamental obstacle to union recognition was the fact that the UMW was racially integrated. Popular opinion was turned against the strikers almost immediately, particularly the disapproving black middle class, who saw racial solidarity and cooperation with capitalists as their only route to economic self-defense. Coal operators launched a propaganda campaign to divide the union along racial lines. A pro-employer newspaper called the Workmen’s Chronicle was distributed free of cost to mine workers. It was published by a black minister named P. C. Rameau who worked out of an office in the TCI building. Oscar Adams, editor of the Birmingham Reporter, spoke to workers in company-owned halls imploring them to remain loyal to mine owners.

Major operators in Alabama's coalfields were also still using convict labor under abominable conditions with no salary cost whatsoever, the convict leasing system, described by some as "Slavery by Another Name".  Mines of the Tennessee Coal, Iron and Railroad Company had phased out convict leasing five years after its acquisition by U.S. Steel, but the mines controlled by Sloss Furnaces and Pratt Consolidated continued the practice until 1926.

The strike 

The strike's first major confrontation happened on September 16, in Patton Junction, Alabama (in Walker County), where strikers killed the general manager of the Corona Coal Company, Leon Adler, along with Earl Edgil, a deputy sheriff.  But African Americans bore the brunt of the violence:  among many such threatening incidents, black miner Henry Junius was found in a shallow grave outside of Roebuck a few weeks into the strike.  At least thirteen houses of strikebreakers were dynamited between September and December.  Also in December, state troopers terrorized the small black business district in Pratt City with random machine gun fire.

The Alabama State Militia and the state police had been called out by the governor, Thomas Kilby, known as the "business governor".  Once on site, state troop commanders typically placed themselves at the service of the coal companies. By February thousands of workers had been evicted from their company houses and left homeless.

Towards the end of February the enormous expense of conducting the strike with no progress led the union to seek a resolution.  None other than Governor Kilby was accepted as arbitrator.  Kilby's settlement flatly refused union recognition and any wage increases, and he refused to reinstate striking miners.  Part of Kilby's March 9 decision read,

The national UMW chose to adhere to Kilby's decision. After the strike ended union advances stagnated; by the end of the decade the UMW would close its state offices.  At least 16 people were killed in the strike, more than half of them black, with an uncounted number of wounded.

Willie Baird 
On December 22, 1920, local union official and itinerant Nazarine minister Adrian Northcutt of Nauvoo, Alabama was summoned out of his home by soldiers of Company M of the Alabama Guard.

After hearing seven shots fired in quick succession, Northcutt's son-in-law William (Willie) Baird rushed out to find Northcutt, dead on the ground, with Private James Morris standing over him.  Baird shot Morris in self-defense, then fled into the woods.  After three days Baird turned himself over to Walker County officials.  On January 5, nine guardsmen of Company M entered the jail, subdued the sheriff on duty, lynched Baird, and riddled his body with bullets.

The guardsmen were eventually acquitted.  Former Alabama governor Braxton Bragg Comer would claim that the lynching of Baird "had some element of self-defense in it".

See also
 List of worker deaths in United States labor disputes
 UMW Anthracite General Strike of 1922

References

Works cited

1920 labor disputes and strikes
Alabama coal strike
Alabama coal strike
Society of Appalachia
Coal Wars
Labor disputes led by the United Mine Workers of America
Mining in Alabama
Lynching deaths in Alabama
Riots and civil disorder in Alabama
Protests in Alabama
Labor disputes in Alabama